Bulgaria participated in the Eurovision Song Contest 2022 in Turin, Italy, having internally selected Intelligent Music Project to represent the country with the song "Intention". The band were announced to be the Bulgarian entrants to the Eurovision Song Contest 2022 on 25 November 2021, with "Intention" released on 7 December 2021.

Bulgaria was drawn to compete in the first semi-final of the Eurovision Song Contest which took place on 10 May 2022. Performing during the show in position 7, "Intention" was not announced among the top 10 entries of the first semi-final and therefore did not qualify to compete in the final. It was later revealed that Bulgaria placed 16 out of the 17 participating countries in the semi-final with 29 points.

Background

The country initially struggled to qualify for the final, with their only success being in  when Elitsa and Stoyan achieved 5th place in the final with the song "Water". In 2014, after a six-year non-qualification streak, the country withdrew from the contest due to financial problems.

In , Bulgaria once again did not participate in the contest due to limited finances, but returned in  backed financially by a sponsor. The broadcaster internally selected Victoria Georgieva to represent the country with "Tears Getting Sober", before the 2020 contest was cancelled due to the COVID-19 pandemic. Georgieva instead represented her country in 2021 with "Growing Up Is Getting Old", which achieved 11th place in the final with 170 points.

BNT broadcasts the event within Bulgaria and organises the selection process for the nation's entry. In the past, BNT had alternated between both internal selections and national finals in order to select the Bulgarian entry. The broadcaster has opted for an internal selection process since 2016, except on their absence from the contest in 2019.

Before Eurovision

Internal selection 
In mid-September 2021, Intelligent Music Project founder Milen Vrabevski revealed to  that they had been selected to represent Bulgaria at the Eurovision Song Contest 2022. No official confirmation came until 25 November, when BNT announced the group as their representative for 2022 with the song "Intention".

At Eurovision 

According to Eurovision rules, all nations with the exceptions of the host country and the "Big Five" (France, Germany, Italy, Spain and the United Kingdom) are required to qualify from one of two semi-finals in order to compete for the final; the top ten countries from each semi-final progress to the final. The European Broadcasting Union (EBU) split up the competing countries into six different pots based on voting patterns from previous contests, with countries with favourable voting histories put into the same pot. On 25 January 2022, an allocation draw was held which placed each country into one of the two semi-finals, as well as which half of the show they would perform in. Bulgaria was placed into the first semi-final, which was held on 10 May 2022, and has been scheduled to perform in the first half of the show.

Once all the competing songs for the 2022 contest had been released, the running order for the semi-finals was decided by the shows' producers rather than through another draw, so that similar songs were not placed next to each other.

In Bulgaria, all shows were broadcast on BNT 1 and BNT 4, with commentary by Elena Rosberg and Petko Kralev. The Bulgarian spokesperson, who announced the top 12-point score awarded by the Bulgarian jury during the final, was Janan Dural.

Semi-final
Intelligent Music Project took part in technical rehearsals on 30 April and 4 May, followed by dress rehearsals on 9 and 10 May. This included the jury show on 9 May where the professional juries of each country watched and voted on the competing entries.

The Bulgarian performance featured the entire band on stage dressed in black clothing. The performance was defined by constant pyrotechnics on stage and intricate patterns on gold coloured LED lights in the background. The band also used the secondary stage as well as the main stage for their performance.

At the end of the show, Bulgaria was not announced among the top 10 entries in the first semi-final and therefore failed to qualify to compete in the final. This was Bulgaria's first non-qualification to the grand final since returning to the contest after a two year absence in 2016. It was later revealed that Bulgaria placed sixteenth in the semi-final, receiving a total of 29 points: 18 points from the televoting and 11 points from the juries.

Voting 

Below is a breakdown of points awarded to Bulgaria during the first semi-final. Voting during the three shows involved each country awarding two sets of points from 1-8, 10 and 12: one from their professional jury and the other from televoting. The exact composition of the professional jury, and the results of each country's jury and televoting were released after the final; the individual results from each jury member were also released in an anonymised form. The Bulgarian jury consisted of JJ, Mary, Nelly Markova Rangelova, VenZy, and Zdravko Tzokov Zheljazkov. In the first semi-final, Bulgaria finished in sixteenth place out of seventeen entries, marking Bulgaria's first non qualification to the final for the first time since 2013.

Points awarded to Bulgaria

Points awarded by Bulgaria

Detailed voting results
The following members comprised the Bulgarian jury:
 JJ – singer, music producer
 Mary – broadcaster, TV presenter, journalist
 Nelly Markova Rangelova – singer-songwriter
 VenZy – musician, songwriter
 Zdravko Tzokov Zheljazkov – journalist

References

2022
Countries in the Eurovision Song Contest 2022
Eurovision